Cinnamomum bodinieri is a species of flowering plant in the family Lauraceae, native to southern China. A tree reaching , it is typically found in situations with more light, such as alongside roads and streams or in open forests and thickets. Its essential oil is high in citral. It is used as a street tree in a number of southern Chinese cities.

References

bodinieri
Trees of China
Endemic flora of China
Flora of South-Central China
Flora of Southeast China
Plants described in 1912